Chinese Social Sciences Citation Index (CSSCI, Chinese: 中文社会科学引文索引) is an interdisciplinary citation index program in China.  It was developed by Nanjing University of China Academy of Social Sciences Research Evaluation Center and the Hong Kong University of Science and Technology in 1998 and was established in 2000. This citation database covers about 500 Chinese academic journals of humanities and social sciences. Now many leading Chinese universities and institutes use CSSCI as a basis for the evaluation of academic achievements and promotion.

According to a 2017 book written by Junping Qiu and other authors, CSSCI "is an important research project of the state and Ministry of Education and an important tool for information inquiry and evaluation of the main documents and information in China." The book said that CSSCI "addresses the blanks" in the Social Sciences Citation Index. Jiangqiu Ge wrote in a 2019 book that people from Nanjin University choose "the top journals with high academic quality from thousands of journals in China". Criteria include how influential the journals are, how often they are quoted, and assessments from specialists. Another criterion is that the journal should have been regularly publishing articles for at least five years. Authors generally consider journals indexed in the CSSCI to be superior so favour writing articles for those journals. Lecturers and associate professors' career advancement is reliant on how many CSSCI journal articles they have written. The 2017–2018 edition of the index had 23 CSSCI law journals.

See also
 List of academic databases and search engines
 Chinese Science Citation Database
 Social Sciences Citation Index
 Arts and Humanities Citation Index

References

External links
 
 2017–2018 edition of CSSI (from Internet Archive)

Nanjing University
Citation indices